Tietoevry Oyj, Tietoevry Corporation, (Tieto prior to Jun 2019) is a Finnish IT software and service company providing IT and product engineering services. Tietoevry is domiciled in Espoo, Finland, and the company's shares are listed on the NASDAQ OMX Helsinki, NASDAQ OMX Stockholm and Oslo Stock Exchange. Tietoevry has approximately 24,000 employees across 20 countries, and has customers in the energy, forestry, banking, and healthcare sectors.

History

Tietotehdas, TT Tieto and Tieto in Finland (1968–1999) 
Tieto started its business operations in Espoo, Finland in 1968 under the name Tietotehdas Oy. During the company's first years, it developed and maintained IT systems mainly for the Union Bank of Finland (Suomen Yhdyspankki, today Nordea) and its customers, as well as a few forestry companies.

The customer base of the company grew during the 1970s, when mini-computers were introduced alongside the existing mainframe computers. Besides mainframe computer services and software, the development of IT systems was also central to the operations of Tietotehdas. Customers represented several industries and operations were organized according to these verticals. During the 1990s, the company experienced rapid growth through a number of acquisitions, mergers and strategic alliances. 
In December 1995, Tietotehdas acquired the Finnish state computer centre (VTKK-Yhtymä Oy). The new company was named TT Tieto Oy.

In 1996, the company strengthened its exposure in the telecom sector considerably through the acquisition of Avancer. The company's name was changed to Tieto Corporation Oyj in 1998.

Enator in Sweden, Denmark, Norway and Finland (1977–1999) 
Enator corporation started in 1977 as a consultant firm created to support the Pronator company with software and project management.

In 1989, Enator AB acquired the Norwegian IT consulting company ISI AS.

In 1990, Enator merged with Modulföretagen and adopted its logo. Enator grew to approximately 650 consultants in Sweden, Denmark, Norway and Finland. In 1993 it was included in the AxData group as a stand-alone company but was sold to Celsius in 1995. The subsidiary's name, Enator, was applied to the whole group in 1995, when Celsius AB, a publicly traded Swedish company, merged the IT operations it had acquired between 1991 and 1994.

In spring 1996, the corporation was listed on the Stockholm Stock Exchange under the name of Enator.

Until 1994, there were IT operations in three separate subsidiaries: Telub, Enator and Dialog. The merger of the three subsidiaries led to a restructuring program in 1997.

During 1998, Enator conducted a series of acquisitions to strengthen the company's public sector exposure. The company acquired 51% of shares in the Stockholm-based consulting firm Programmera. In addition, the company acquired two small IT companies – Kvatro Telecom in Trondheim, Norway, and Soft Project in Hamburg, Germany – and divested from operations in Enator Telecom Mechanics. In April 1999, Enator acquired NetDesign in Denmark. After the Enator–Tieto merger in July 1999, the Enator brand was discontinued.

TietoEnator (1999–2007) 

In 1999, Tieto and Enator corporation merged to form TietoEnator after Tieto made a public buyout offer for Enator. Sixty-eight per cent of TietoEnator’s share capital was transferred to Tieto’s shareholders. Finland was chosen as the base for the new company, and Tieto’s CEO, Matti Lehti, was selected to head the company. The new company became one of the largest ICT companies in Europe: it had 10,335 employees and revenue of approximately 6.5 billion Finnish markkas.

Significant acquisitions included Ementor Financial Systems in February 2002, followed by DaWinci Services AS in December of that year. The latter acquisition provided control over the offshore Personnel Transportation & Tracking Solution, giving Tieto Norway a 100% market share of systems for operating the Norwegian Continental Shelf personnel movements.

In 2005, the Western Norway Regional Health Authority, Norwegian Helse Vest RHF, signed an agreement with TietoEnator Norway for the delivery of a system for Electronic health records. By the end of 2007, Helse Vest RHF concluded its customer relationship with the company and announced a lawsuit against TietoEnator because they did not think it was able to deliver, and claimed compensation from TietoEnator. The Southern Norway Regional Health Authority, Helse Sør, experienced that their frame agreement from 2004 made no deliveries, and was considering legal actions against TietoEnator Norway.

Tieto (2009–2018) 

TietoEnator was officially renamed Tieto Corporation in 2009. Tieto means knowledge in Finnish. The corporation was led from its Helsinki headquarters. Starting from year 2009, Tieto went with an aggressive strategy of offshore production, reaching up to the end of the decade.

The CEO, Hannu Syrjälä, resigned in April 2011. In July, Kimmo Alkio, CEO of F-Secure, was appointed as his successor.

On 25 November 2011, there was a hardware failure in one of Tieto's Swedish data centers, which affected approximately 50 of its clients, including Apoteket, Bilprovningen, SBAB Bank and the Stockholm Municipality school web site. On 30 November, Tieto services for Apoteket and SBAB were recovered and operational again. By 13 December, virtually all services were back to normal operations. On 22 February 2012, the Swedish Civil Contingencies Agency published the report on Reflections on community safety and preparedness for serious IT incidents In March 2012, Tieto released a report investigating the incident.

In June 2015, Tieto signed an agreement to acquire Software Innovation, a software company in the Enterprise Content Management (ECM) business in the Nordic countries.
In November 2015, Tieto acquired Imano AB, a Swedish consulting company offering consulting and digitalization services to paper and forestry industries.
In December 2015, Tieto signed an agreement to acquire Smilehouse, the largest Finnish solution provider of multichannel commerce with operations primarily in Finland and Sweden.

In 2016, Empathic Building technology was introduced at Tieto’s head office in Espoo. The technology can track attributes such as people flows and the occupancy rate of premises. Various sensors and displays allow employees to see where they can find free workstations and their colleagues and enable them to choose a workstation based on factors such as temperature and noise. The building was awarded the platinum rating under the Leadership in Energy and Environmental Design certification system. In October 2020, the Empathic Building technology was sold to Haltian.

EVRY in Norway and Sweden (2010–2019) 

EVRY's history started as EDB ErgoGroup ASA that was formed in 2010 with the merger of EDB Business Partner and ErgoGroup. Telenor owned most of the shares of ErgoGroup. The company subsequently changed its name to EVRY ASA in April 2012.

In March 2015, Apax Partners became the majority owner of the company, a new board was appointed and it decided to apply for a de-listing from the stock exchange. On 29 October 2015, the company was delisted from the Oslo Stock Exchange. In August, following the loss of a contract with Norwegian bank DNB, EVRY announced it would lay off 500–550 workers in Norway and Sweden to increase profits, saving 400–500 million Norwegian krones. In October 2015 it announced the transfer of a further 600 employees to IBM in an outsourcing deal worth 1 billion dollars.

Tietoevry (2019 to present) 

The merger of EVRY, a Norwegian company, into Tieto was announced in June 2019. The intention was to expand on the Nordic market. The new company was named as Tietoevry, having over 24.000 employees and an estimated revenue of over 3 billion euros for the fiscal year 2020. In addition to cash compensation, EVRY’s shareholders received 37.5 per cent of the shares in the new company. Tomas Franzén, a member of Tieto’s board of directors, was appointed chair of Tietoevry’s board, and Tieto’s CEO, Kimmo Alkio, was selected to head the new company. The acquisition made Apax Partners the largest shareholder in TietoEVRY, with a stake of approximately 20 per cent. The merger was concluded on 5 December 2019, and the shares were floated on the Oslo stock exchange on the same date. Tietoevry’s shares are listed also on the Helsinki and Stockholm stock exchanges.

In August 2020, the Legal Register Centre of Finland signed a procurement agreement worth 10 million euros with Tietoevry. In October, Tietoevry made an agreement worth nearly 30 million euros with the City of Västerås in Sweden. In November, it made an agreement worth 10 million euros with Stockholm.

Organization 

Tietoevry’s main office is Keilaniemi, Espoo. Tietoevry’s CEO is Kimmo Alkio while the chair of the board of directors is Tomas Franzén.

In spring 2020, 4,600 of the company’s employees were based in Sweden, 4,400 were in Norway, 4,200 were in India, and 3,200 were in Finland.

In 2022, the company was divided into six operating segments:
Tietoevry Create (Digital consulting)
Tietoevry Connect (Cloud services and infrastructure solutions)
Tietoevry Industry (Industrial software)
Tietoevry Banking (Financial services solutions)
Tietoevry Care (Healthcare and related products and services)
Tietoevry Transform (International operations)

Tietoevry ’s shares are listed on the Helsinki, Stockholm and Oslo stock exchanges. On 31 July 2021, Tietoevry’s largest shareholders were Solidium Oy, Ilmarinen Mutual Pension Insurance Company, Elo Mutual Pension Insurance Company, The State Pension Fund and Nordea funds.

Partners
Tietoevry collaborates with Microsoft in public cloud services. They also have a joint training programme in which thousands of Azure professionals are certified for Tietoevry.

Products and services
Tietoevry provides its customers with cloud services, IT services and systems that it also develops and maintains. It also offers services such as financing.

Tietoevry’s customers operate in numerous sectors, including the health care, banking, forestry industries in Europe and around the world.

In spring 2020, Tietoevry held a market share of approximately 20 per cent in Finland, more than 20 per cent in Norway, and 14 per cent in Sweden. Its customers included tyre company Goodyear, payment services company Getswish, insurance company Folksam, Norwegian ministries and the City of Stockholm. In Finland, the company’s customers included Lassila & Tikanoja, Suominen and Ahlstrom-Munksjö.

Tietoevry supports the Tietoallas service and Terveyskylä project for the Hospital District of Helsinki and Uusimaa. The company is piloting biometric payment cards with OP Financial Group. Among other clients, the company acts as the cloud and infrastructure service provider to the Ilmarinen Mutual Pension Insurance Company.

Social responsibility

Tietoevry and Wärtsilä are among the founding members of the Committed Energy group. This forum, set up in 2018, works towards clean energy. In December 2020, Tietoevry made it onto the A List of the CDP organisation, which assesses the climate and environmental actions of companies. The company had been most successful in preventing climate risks. The companies on the A List are ones that have set ambitious environmental and climate goals, disclose them transparently and take them into consideration in their operations. The CDP assessed a total of 5,800 companies, five per cent of which made it onto the A List.

In February 2021, Tietoevry was ranked first in a study conducted by Talouselämä to compare the 40 companies in the Helsinki Stock Exchange’s Sustainability Index against four criteria measuring valuation and returns.

The company has developed a font known as The Polite Type in collaboration with professionals from the Finnish Children and Youth Foundation. The font is based on open source code and replaces terms of abuse with neutral word choices.

See also
Tieto Keilalahti Campus

References

External links 

Companies based in Espoo
Companies listed on Nasdaq Helsinki
Software companies of Finland
Information technology consulting firms of Finland
ICT service providers
Software companies established in 1968
Finnish brands
Companies listed on Nasdaq Stockholm
Computer companies of Finland
Consulting firms established in 1968
Finnish companies established in 1968